Nissenbaum is a surname. Notable people with the surname include:

Helen Nissenbaum (born 1954), privacy and computer law scholar
Henry Nissen (born 1948 as Henry Nissenbaum), German/Australian boxer of the 1970s
Jesse Nissenbaum, American singer/songwriter